The H. G. W. Mayberry House, also known as Beechwood Hall, is a historic antebellum plantation house built in 1856 in Franklin, Tennessee.

Plantation house
Beechwood Hall was the manor house of one of the three largest plantations in Williamson, prior to the American Civil War. The mansion's original owners were Sophronia Hunter Mayberry and Henry George Washington Mayberry.

It includes Greek Revival and Italianate style architectural elements.

The other two contenders for Williamson County's largest plantation are those of the Samuel F. Glass House plantation, and the "Ravenswood" plantation (James H. Wilson House), both also NRHP-listed.

The house was owned at various times by country music singers Hank Williams Sr., Tim McGraw and Faith Hill.

See also
Henry H. Mayberry House
National Register of Historic Places listings in Franklin County, Tennessee

References

Houses in Franklin, Tennessee
Houses completed in 1856
Houses on the National Register of Historic Places in Tennessee
Antebellum architecture
Greek Revival houses in Tennessee
Italianate architecture in Tennessee
National Register of Historic Places in Williamson County, Tennessee